State Route 195 (SR 195) is a  highway running mainly in a north and south direction through two counties, Winston and Walker in the U.S. state of Alabama.

Route description
The southern terminus of SR 195 is located at its intersection with SR 5 in Jasper. From this point the route travels in a north-northwest direction in intersecting SR 257 and traversing the William B. Bankhead National Forest en route to Double Springs. In Double Springs, SR 195 has a  concurrency with US 278 prior to resuming its northerly route. The route continues in its northwesterly route through its intersection with SR 243 where it turns to the southwest en route to its northern terminus at SR 13 in Haleyville.

Major intersections

References

195
Transportation in Walker County, Alabama
Transportation in Winston County, Alabama